Liulimiao Town is a town located on the center of Huairou District, Beijing. It is located at the foot of Yunmeng Mountain of the Yan Mountains.It shares border with Baoshan and Tanghekou Towns to the north, Shicheng Town to the east, Yanqi and Huaibei Towns to the south, as well as Sihai Town and Zhenzhuquan Township to the west. The population for this town was 4,312 as of 2020.

History

Administrative divisions 
In the year 2021, Liulimiao Town was subdivided into 25 villages:

Gallery

References

Huairou District
Towns in Beijing